WMRL is a Public Radio formatted broadcast radio station licensed to and serving Lexington, Virginia.  WMRL is owned and operated by James Madison University. WMRL rebroadcasts sister station WMRA full-time.

References

External links
 WMRA Online
 

1992 establishments in Virginia
Public radio stations in the United States
NPR member stations
Radio stations established in 1992
MRL
MRL
James Madison University